The Shed is a 2019 American vampire horror film directed by Frank Sabatella. Sabatella wrote the screenplay, based on a story by Jason Rice. The films stars Jay Jay Warren, Cody Kostro, Sofia Happonen, Siobhan Fallon Hogan, with Timothy Bottoms and Frank Whaley. The Shed would debut at the Sitges Film Festival in October 2019 before releasing theatrically the following month by RLJE Films.

Plot
Two best friends, Stan and Dommer, have dealt with bullies their whole lives. When Stan discovers a murderous vampire taking shelter in his shed, he knows he has to find a way to destroy it. But Dommer has a more sinister plan for the vampire

Cast
Jay Jay Warren as Stan
Cody Kostro as Dommer
Sofia Happonen as Roxy
Siobhan Fallon Hogan as Sheriff Dorney
Timothy Bottoms as Ellis
Frank Whaley as Bane
Chris Petrovski as Marble
Francisco Burgos as Pitt
Uly Schlesinger as Ozzy
Mu-Shaka Benson as Deputy Haiser
Damian Norfleet as Ancient Vampire

Production

Development
In 2002, aspiring filmmaker Frank Sabatella was impressed with a short story involving a vampire in a shed written by Jason Rice. After making his directorial debut in Blood Night: The Legend of Mary Hatchet, Sabatella circled back to the idea and asked Rice for permission to use the concept. While writing the film, Sabatella was influenced by Fright Night, The Lost Boys and River's Edge, the latter of which he cited as "important" for crafting the film's characters. The first draft of the script was written in six months during 2014. By 2016, Peter Block - along with his production company A Bigger Boat - and Hatchet producer Cory Neal signed on to produce the film, with the script entering its fifth draft.

Pre-production
By September 2018, the film was officially announced with Frank Whaley, Timothy Bottoms, Siobhan Fallon Hogan, Sofia Happonen, Cody Kostro, and Jay Jay Warren filling out the cast. When casting the film's leads, Sabatella opted to cast actors that were the same age as their characters to add believability to the roles. The director was a fan of actor Frank Whaley and had the producers reach out and "orchestrate" his casting. The film also marked the on-screen debut for actress Sofia Happonen.

Filming
Production began in Syracuse, New York and lasted 17 days throughout August 2018.

Release
The Shed premiered at the Sitges Film Festival on October 5, 2019. The film was released on November 15, 2019, by RLJE Films.

Home media
The film was released on Blu-ray and DVD on January 7, 2020.

Reception

Leslie Felperin of The Guardian said the film was "an efficient enough machine for generating scares." For Slashfilm, Rafael Motamayor called the film "a dark and poignant look at bullying and how easy it is to fall into a dark path of revenge, while also being a traditional horror movie." Noel Murray, writing for The LA Times, wrote "a good young cast and a strong sense of purpose compensate for most of the shortcomings."

Writing for Observer, Rex Reed said "There's nothing to make your hair stand on end in The Shed because it's not convincing." Of Flickering Myth, Matt Donato wrote "Sabatella serves the subgenre fine, but draws out the same overused actions".

References 

American horror films
2019 horror films
American vampire films
2010s English-language films
2010s American films